Second Lieutenant Alfred Victor Smith VC (22 July 1891 – 22 December 1915), known to his family as Victor, was a British Army officer and an English recipient of the Victoria Cross (VC), the highest and most prestigious award for gallantry in the face of the enemy that can be awarded to British and Commonwealth forces.

Smith was 24 years old, and a Second lieutenant in the 1/5th Battalion, East Lancashire Regiment, British Army on 22 December 1915 at Helles, Gallipoli, Ottoman Turkey during the First World War, and who died in action for which he was awarded the VC. His citation reads:

He is buried in Twelve Tree Copse Cemetery in the Gallipoli peninsula, although the precise location of his grave within the cemetery is not known. He was also awarded a French Croix de Guerre.

Alfred Victor Smith’s father was a Police officer and although Alfred was born in Guildford, the family moved several times in his youth, and Alfred sang as a boy chorister in St Albans Cathedral Choir. At 14 his father was appointed chief constable of Burnley, and they moved to the town, with Alfred completing his education at Burnley Grammar School. After leaving school he joined Blackpool Borough Police force. He is named on commemorative plaques within the former Burnley Grammar School, St Catherine's Church, Burnley, St Albans Cathedral, and the current Blackpool Police headquarters.

In November 2015 a commemorative stone was unveiled in Guildford.

His VC, along with other items, is on display at the Towneley Hall museum in Burnley.

References

Further reading
 Monuments to Courage (David Harvey, 1999)
 The Register of the Victoria Cross (This England, 1997)
 VCs of the First World War - Gallipoli (Stephen Snelling, 1995)

1891 births
1915 deaths
Military personnel from Guildford
People educated at Burnley Grammar School
British police officers
East Lancashire Regiment officers
British Army personnel of World War I
British Gallipoli campaign recipients of the Victoria Cross
British military personnel killed in World War I
Recipients of the Croix de Guerre 1914–1918 (France)
People from Guildford
British Army recipients of the Victoria Cross
Burials at Twelve Tree Copse Commonwealth War Graves Commission Cemetery
Deaths by hand grenade